Fantasize may refer to:

 Making a fantasy
 Fantasize (album), a 2014 album by Kye Kye
 Fantasize, an album by Ponty Bone
 "Fantasize", a 2009 single by Jérémy Amelin
 "Fantasize", a song by The Specials from the 1998 album Guilty 'til Proved Innocent!
 "Fantasize", a song by Liz Phair from the 1998 album whitechocolatespaceegg
 "Fantasize", a song by Guy Sebastian from his 2020 album T.R.U.T.H.